Nicholas Leonicus Thomaeus (1456–1531) was a Venetian scholar and professor of philosophy as well as of Greek and Latin at the University of Padua.

Biography
Thomaeus was born in Venice, Italy on February 1, 1456, to an Albanian or Greek family from Epirus or Albania. While in Florence, he studied Greek philosophy and literature under the tutelage of Demetrios Chalcondyles. In 1497, the University of Padua appointed Thomaeus as its first official lecturer on the Greek text of Aristotle. In 1504, he was elected to succeed Giorgio Valla as chair of Greek in Venice, but because Thomaeus failed to take the post seriously, he was succeeded in 1512 by Marcus Musurus. In 1524, Thomaeus published a collection of philosophical dialogues in Latin, the first of which was titled Trophonius, sive, De divinatione. He was admired by scholars such as Desiderius Erasmus for his philological capabilities. When the University of Padua was reopened after the wars of the League of Cambrai, Thomaeus taught at the university until his death on March 28, 1531.

Works
 Aristotelis Parva quae vocant Naturalia, Bernardino Vitali, Venice 1523.
 Trophonius, sive, De divinatione, 1524.
 Bembo sive de immortalitate animae, 1524.
 Opuscula. Ex Venetiis, Bernardino Vitali, Venice 1525.
 Conversio in Latinum atque explanatio primi libri Aristotelis de partibus animalium… nunc primum ex authoris archetypo in lucem aeditus.  G. Farri, Venice 1540.

See also
Byzantine scholars in Renaissance

References

Sources

Further reading

 

15th-century Venetian writers
1456 births
1531 deaths
Republic of Venice philosophers
Venetian Albanians
16th-century Albanian people
15th-century Albanian people
Academic staff of the University of Padua
Italian philologists
Aristotelian philosophers
Venetian Greeks
16th-century Italian educators
15th-century Greek educators
16th-century Greek educators